Kevin Sneader (born c. 1966) is a Canadian-born British management consultant. He was McKinsey & Company's global managing partner from July 2018 to July 2021. He failed to secure a second term in that position in early 2021, becoming the first global managing partner since 1976 not to win such an election. He was hired by Goldman Sachs as co-president for the Asia-Pacific region in September 2021.

Early life and education
Kevin Sneader was born 1966 in Canada and grew up in Glasgow, Scotland. His father, Walter Sneader, was a chemistry professor at the University of Strathclyde; his mother, Myrna, was a teacher in a Jewish nursery school. He is Jewish.

Sneader attended Hutchesons' Grammar School in Glasgow and went on to graduate from the University of Glasgow, where he earned a Bachelor of Laws. He earned a Master of Business Administration from Harvard Business School, where he was a Baker Scholar.

Career
Sneader joined McKinsey and Company upon graduating from the University of Glasgow. He was the managing partner of McKinsey's UK and Ireland division until 2014, when he became the chairman of its Asia-Pacific division. In February 2018, he was appointed as McKinsey's global managing partner to succeed Dominic Barton in July. Kevin Sneader was McKinsey’s first Scottish, and its first Jewish, leader.

Personal life
Sneader is married to Amy Muntner. Sneader lives in Hong Kong with his wife, Amy, and their two daughters.

Controversy 
In 2019, McKinsey & Company received criticism for its role as consultant to the U.S. Immigration and Customs Enforcement agency. In a 2019 email to the firm, Sneader indicated that McKinsey had never focused on developing, advising or implementing immigration policies. McKinsey, he wrote, “will not, under any circumstances, engage in work, anywhere in the world, that advances or assists policies that are at odds with our values.” A subsequent New York Times investigation claimed that McKinsey's involvement in deportations had been more extensive than Sneader acknowledged in his email.

References

Living people
1960s births
Businesspeople from Glasgow
Scottish Jews
Alumni of the University of Glasgow
Harvard Business School alumni
McKinsey & Company people
British management consultants
Canadian management consultants